Soo Teck Zhi (born 4 August 1995) is a Malaysian badminton player. He participated at the Vietnam Open 2012, 2012 India Open Grand Prix Gold, 2012 Thailand Open Grand Prix Gold and the 2013 Thailand Open Grand Prix Gold. In 2013 he won the gold medal at the Asian Junior Championships in the boys' singles event.

Career 
In his senior career, Soo reached the semifinals of the Copenhagen Masters in 2014 and was the runner-up of the Singapore International in 2015.

He later entered his first BWF Grand Prix semifinal at the 2016 New Zealand Open Grand Prix Gold. In 2018, he won the Bangladesh International and achieved two runner-up positions at the Sydney International and the Nepal International. In 2019, Soo lost the final of the Portugal International to Felix Burestedt of Sweden.

Achievements

Asian Junior Championships 
Boys' singles

BWF International Challenge/Series (1 title, 4 runner-up) 
Men's singles

  BWF International Challenge tournament
  BWF International Series tournament

BWF Junior International (1 runner-up) 
Boys' singles

  BWF Junior International Grand Prix tournament
  BWF Junior International Challenge tournament
  BWF Junior International Series tournament
  BWF Junior Future Series tournament

References

External links 
 

1995 births
Living people
People from Selangor
Malaysian sportspeople of Chinese descent
Malaysian male badminton players
21st-century Malaysian people